Hagoromo Club was a Japanese football club based in Shizuoka. The club has played in Japan Soccer League Division 2.

Club name
1948–1972 : Nippon Light Metal SC
1973–1974 : Hagoromo Club

External links
Football of Japan

 
Japan Soccer League clubs
1948 establishments in Japan
1974 disestablishments in Japan
Sports teams in Shizuoka Prefecture
Shizuoka (city)
Defunct football clubs in Japan
Association football clubs established in 1948
Association football clubs disestablished in 1974
Works association football clubs in Japan